Coleophora ladonia is a moth of the family Coleophoridae. It is found in Florida, United States.

References

ladonia
Moths described in 1993
Moths of North America